Cunanan is a Hispanized Pampangan surname.

Notable people
Andrew Cunanan (1969–1997), Filipino-American serial killer 
Emmerie Cunanan, Filipina fashion model
Lucia Cunanan (1927 or 1928–2008) Filipina restaurateur
Tom Cunanan, Filipino American chef